The 2016 Black-Eyed Susan Stakes was the 92nd running of the Black-Eyed Susan Stakes. The race took place on May 20, 2016, and was televised in the United States on the NBC Sports Network. Ridden by jockey Luis Saez, Go Maggie Go won the race by a two and one-half lengths over runner-up Ma Can Do It. Approximate post time on the Friday evening before the Preakness Stakes was 4:51 p.m. Eastern Time. The Maryland Jockey Club supplied a purse of $250,000 for the 92nd running. The race was run over a fast track in a final time of 1:51.81.  The Maryland Jockey Club reported a Black-Eyed Susan Stakes Day record attendance of 47,956. The attendance at Pimlico Race Course that day was a record crowd for Black-Eyed Susan Stakes Day and the sixth largest for a thoroughbred race in North America in 2016.

Payout 

The 92nd Black-Eyed Susan Stakes Payout Schedule

$2 Exacta:  (5–4) paid   $ 202.20

$2 Trifecta:  (5–4–10) paid   $ 1,486.60

$1 Superfecta:  (5–4–10-2) paid   $ 6,212.30

The full chart 

 Winning Breeder: Mike Tarp; (KY)  
 Final Time: 1:51.81
 Track Condition: Fast
 Total Attendance: Record of 47,956

See also 
 2016 Preakness Stakes
 Black-Eyed Susan Stakes Stakes "top three finishers" and # of  starters

References

External links 
 Official Black-Eyed Susan Stakes website
 Official Preakness website

2016 in horse racing
Horse races in Maryland
2016 in American sports
2016 in sports in Maryland
Black-Eyed Susan Stakes